The 1997–98 Calgary Flames season was the 18th National Hockey League season in Calgary. After a disappointing 1996–97 season, the Flames looked to newly hired coach Brian Sutter to return the Flames to the playoffs.

The off-season featured the trade of highly popular forward Gary Roberts shortly before the season began. Roberts missed the entire 1996–97 NHL season due to injury after playing only 35 games in 1995–96. Feeling that playing in the Eastern Conference with its lower travel would help aid him in his comeback, the Flames agreed to trade Roberts. He was dealt, along with starting goaltender Trevor Kidd to the Carolina Hurricanes for Andrew Cassels and Jean-Sebastien Giguere.

The season would serve as a bitter disappointment for the Flames from start to end, as the Flames would struggle to score goals all season long, ultimately finishing with the worst record in Calgary history at 26–41–15, while 67 points was the lowest in franchise history since the expansion Atlanta Flames managed just 65 in 1972–73. The Flames finished eleven points behind the 8th place San Jose Sharks, missing the playoffs for the second straight season.

Theoren Fleury was named to the North American team at the 1998 NHL All Star Game, where he recorded two assists playing on a line with Wayne Gretzky and Mark Recchi. Defenceman Derek Morris was named a Rookie All Star.

Fleury also represented Canada at the 1998 Winter Olympics in Nagano, Japan.

Prior to the start of the season, the Flames purchased the Western Hockey League's Calgary Hitmen for approximately $1.5 million. The struggling franchise was nearly destroyed by the fallout of the Graham James scandal.

Regular season

On Friday, October 17, 1997, the Flames scored three short-handed goals in a 6-5 win over the Colorado Avalanche.

Season standings

Schedule and results

Player statistics

Skaters
Note: GP = Games played; G = Goals; A = Assists; Pts = Points; PIM = Penalty minutes

†Denotes player spent time with another team before joining Calgary. Stats reflect time with the Flames only.

Goaltenders
Note: GP = Games played; TOI = Time on ice (minutes); W = Wins; L = Losses; OT = Overtime/shootout losses; GA = Goals against; SO = Shutouts; GAA = Goals against average

Transactions
The Flames were involved in the following transactions during the 1997–98 season.

Trades

Free agents

Draft picks

Calgary's picks at the 1998 NHL Entry Draft, held in Pittsburgh, Pennsylvania.

Farm teams

Saint John Flames
The Baby Flames finished the 1997–98 American Hockey League season with a franchise record 43 wins, as their 43–24–13 record led the Flames to the Atlantic Division title, the first division championship in team history. The Flames marched to the Calder Cup finals, defeating the St. John's Maple Leafs 3–1, the Portland Pirates 4–2, and Hartford Wolf Pack 4–1. The Flames fell to the Philadelphia Phantoms 4–2 in the finals, however.  Hnat Domenichelli led the Flames with 33 goals, while Ladislav Kohn led the team with 56 points. Tyler Moss played the majority of the games in goal, leading the team with 19 wins in 39 games, while his 2.49 GAA was just behind the 2.46 posted by Jean-Sebastien Giguere in 31 games.

See also
 1997–98 NHL season

References

 Player stats: 2006–07 Calgary Flames Media Guide, p. 114.
 Game log: 1997–98 Calgary Flames game log, usatoday.com, accessed January 14, 2007.
 Team standings:  1997–98 NHL standings @hockeydb.com.
 Trades: hockeydb.com player pages.

Calgary Flames seasons
Calgary Flames season, 1997-98
Calg